Gorë is a former municipality in the Korçë County, southeastern Albania. At the 2015 local government reform it became a subdivision of the municipality Maliq. The population at the 2011 census was 1,565. The municipal unit consists of the villages Zvarisht, Dolan, Lozhan, Lozhan i Ri, Senishtë, Tresovë, Strelcë, Shalës, Selcë, Velçan, Mesmal, Moçan, Mjaltas, Marjan, Desmirë, Qënckë, Babjen and Dolanec.

Notable people
Kristo Shuli

References 

Former municipalities in Korçë County
Administrative units of Maliq